This article organizes the status of articles about the infrastructure in Africa.

Road

Angola

Via Expresso.

Botswana

Benin
Benin's coastal RNIE1 from Cotonou to Nigeria have improved widened divided roadways of various quality.

Ethiopia

Ghana

Part of Ghana's coastal highway is 4 laned, and it consists of a controlled access section called "George W. Bush Highway", as well as the Tema-Accra highway. Part of the Tema-Accra highway is concrete, but the lanes are unmarked. They drive on the right.

Kenya
The Thika Road is an eight-lane. They drive on the left.

Namibia
Highway B1 near Highway C28 is 4 lane controlled access.

Nigeria

Nigeria has numerous improved 4-laned roadways, including grade separations for railways. Near and inside cities have partial grade separations with feeder roads. Benin's coastal RNIE1 near the border between Benin and Nigeria is a 4 laned controlled access highway. As it crosses into Nigeria, it becomes the "Lagos-Bagadry Express Way". It continues until its terminus east of Apapa road. (Apapa Road is also 4 lane controlled access.) Other roads are:
Apongbon St.
Ijora Cause Way
Ring Road
Highway E1, "Lagos-Ibadan Expressway" (It briefly reverts to 2 lanes at Ojodu.) This highway is 4 laned almost its entire run, with controlled access most of its run. The Lagos-Ibadan Expressway terminates at Ibadan, as well as Highway E1. However, the road does not end. 2-laned Highway A1 merges onto the 4-laned road. The road is now called Highway A1 instead of E1 or Lagos-Ibadan Expressway, even though it is the same road.
Highway A1 is otherwise a 2 laned road, until the road known as E1 until it reaches Ibadan becomes known as A1. This road continues as 4-laned until it reaches Ishokun. The road merges onto a 2 laned road. East of this junction is known as A1.
Although considered Controlled Access, there are several ring roads substituting for grade separations thus are not controlled access.
Nigeria drives on the right.

South Africa

Numbered routes in South Africa

  Highway 1 is a toll road. The 2 laned section becomes 4 lanes near Highway R33 and trades with Highway 14. The two highways trade. (Highway 1 becomes Highway 14 and Highway 14 becomes highway 1). Highway 1 becomes 2 lanes at highway R59. It briefly becomes 4 lanes at Kroonstad, Ventersburg, from R703 to Blydskap (with controlled access through Bloemfontein), ... and becomes 4 lane controlled access at Cape Town.
Highway 4 is a toll road. Highway 4 expands to 4 lanes near an airport runway. This 4 lane section is divided and controlled access. Highway 4 merges with Highway 1 and proceeds south until it leaves Highway 1. Highway 4 continues both east and west of Highway 1. Highway 4 east of Highway 1 reduces to 2 lanes near Highway R35. West of Highway 1, Highway 4's terminus is between R511 and R104. Highway 4 is 4 lane until its terminus.
Highway 14 terminates at Highway 4. Highway 14 is a 4 laned controlled access until it trades with Highway 1. "Highway 14" continues as 4 lane controlled access until Highway R114. It continues as a standard 4 lane divided highway from that point to another highway trade, this time trading with Highway R28. East of this highway is Highway M47 which is 4 lanes for a short distance before reducing to 2 lanes. West of this highway is now Highway 14, which is 2 laned.
Highway R28 is the same road previously assigned as Highway 14. Highway R28 is standard 4 lane divided. The railroads are grade separated. Highway R28 trades joins Main Reef Road. The new Highway R28 is still 4 lane until its intersection with Highway 12.
Highway M1 is 4 laned controlled access from Highway 1 (the same road) to the intersection of David St / Constantia Ave.
Highway R82 (the same road as highway M1 and Highway 1) is a 4 lane divided highway, but it is not controlled access. It reduces to 2 lanes shortly before it terminates at Highway R557.

Rail

Botswana

Ethiopia

Ethiopia contains double track mixed use electric railways.

Ghana

The rail in Ghana includes a single track line from Tema to Accra. It serves passenger rail. Parts of the line have railroad crossings, while others travel over or under roads.

South Africa
Rail transport in South Africa

South Africa includes double track light rail.

Uganda

Utilities

Telecom
Internet throughout Africa is available by Satellite Internet. It costs more than $1,000.00 USD per month.

Hospitals

Airports

Rail transport

Ports

Water Supply

Schools

Universities

See also
China Africa Development Fund
Africa-China Relations

References

Infrastructure in Africa